Netherlands–Ukraine relations are foreign relations between the Netherlands and Ukraine. The two countries established diplomatic relations in 1992. Notable incidents in their relations include was the shoot-down of Malaysia Airlines Flight 17 in 2014 and the 2016 Dutch Ukraine–European Union Association Agreement referendum.

Resident diplomatic missions
 Netherlands has an embassy in Kyiv.
 Ukraine has an embassy in The Hague.

See also 
 Foreign relations of the Netherlands
 Foreign relations of Ukraine

References

External links
  Dutch Ministry of Foreign Affairs about relations with Ukraine (in Dutch only)
 Dutch embassy in Kyiv (Archive)
  Ukrainian embassy in The Hague (new site)
  Ukrainian embassy in The Hague (old website version)\

 

 
Ukraine 
Bilateral relations of Ukraine